Noonmati is a locality  located in Guwahati, Assam in North East India.

It is the place where Indian Oil Company (now the Indian Oil Corporation) commissioned its first oil refinery, the Guwahati Refinery on 1 January 1962.

Geography

References

Cities and towns in Kamrup district
Neighbourhoods in Guwahati